The Orion Arm is a minor spiral arm of the Milky Way Galaxy that is  across and approximately  in length, containing the Solar System, including Earth. It is also referred to by its full name, the Orion–Cygnus Arm (not to be confused with the outer end of the Norma Arm the Cygnus Arm), as well as Local Arm, Orion Bridge, and formerly, the Local Spur and Orion Spur.

The arm is named for the Orion Constellation, which is one of the most prominent constellations of Northern Hemisphere winter (Southern Hemisphere summer).  Some of the brightest stars and most famous celestial objects of the constellation (e.g. Betelgeuse, Rigel, the three stars of Orion's Belt, the Orion Nebula) are within it as shown on the interactive map below.

The arm is between the Carina–Sagittarius Arm (the local portions of which are toward the Galactic Center) and the Perseus Arm (the local portion of which is the main outer-most arm and one of two major arms of the galaxy). 

Long thought to be a minor structure, namely a "spur" between the two arms mentioned, evidence was presented in mid 2013 that the Orion Arm might be a branch of the Perseus Arm, or possibly an independent arm segment.

Recently, the parallax and proper motion of more than 30 methanol (6.7-GHz) and water (22-GHz) masers in high-mass star-forming regions within a few kiloparsecs of the Sun were measured. Measurement accuracy was better than ±10% and even 3%, the best parallax measurement in the BeSSeL project (Bar and Spiral Structure Legacy Survey). The accuracy locations of interstellar masers in HMSFRs (high-mass star-forming regions) have been shown that the Local Arm appears to be an orphan segment of an arm between the Sagittarius and Perseus arms that wraps around less than a quarter of the Milky Way. The segment has the length of ~20,000 ly and the width of ~3,000 ly with the pitch angle from 10.1° ± 2.7° to 11.6° ± 1.8°. These results reveal that the Local Arm is larger than previously thought, and both its pitch angle and star formation rate are comparable to those of the Galaxy’s major spiral arms. The Local Arm is reasonably referred to as the fifth feature in the Milky Way. The “spur” interpretation may be incorrect.

To understand the form of the Local Arm between the Sagittarius and Perseus arms, the stellar density of a specific population of stars with about 1 Gyr of age between 90° ≤ l ≤ 270° have been mapped using the Gaia DR2. The 1 Gyr population have been employed because they are significantly more-evolved objects than the gas in HMSFRs tracing the Local Arm. Investigations have been carried out to compare both the stellar density and gas distribution along the Local Arm. Researchers have found a marginally significant arm-like stellar overdensity close to the Local Arm, identified with the HMSFRs especially in the region of 90° ≤ l ≤ 190°. They have concluded that the Local Arm is the arm segment associated with only the gas and star-forming clouds, with a significant stellar overdensity. Additionally, they have found that the pitch angle of the stellar arm is slightly larger than the gas-defined arm, and also there is an offset between gas-defined and stellar arm. The offset and different pitch angles between the stellar and HMSFR-defined spiral arms are consistent with the expectation that star formation lags the gas compression in a spiral density wave lasting longer than the typical star formation timescale of 107 − 108 years.

Messier objects

The Orion Arm contains a number of Messier objects:
The Butterfly Cluster (M6)
The Ptolemy Cluster (M7)
Open Cluster M23
Open Cluster M25
The Dumbbell Nebula (M27)
Open Cluster M29
Open Cluster M34
Open Cluster M35
Open Cluster M39
Winnecke 4 (M40)
Open Cluster M41
The Orion Nebula (M42)
The De Mairan's Nebula (M43)
The Beehive Cluster (M44)
The Pleiades (M45)
Open Cluster M46
Open Cluster M47
Open Cluster M48
Open Cluster M50
The Ring Nebula (M57)
Open Cluster M67
M73
The Little Dumbbell Nebula (M76)
Diffuse Nebula M78
Open Cluster M93
The Owl Nebula (M97)

Interactive maps

Other maps

See also

 Galactic disc
 Gould Belt
 Jon Lomberg's Milky Way painting used as background for Kepler Mission diagram, showing the Sun's location on the Orion Spur
 Local Bubble
 Loop I Bubble
 List of Messier objects
 List of nearest stars and brown dwarfs

References

External links
Messier Objects in the Milky Way (SEDS)
A 3D map of the Milky Way Galaxy

 
Milky Way arms
Galactic astronomy
Spiral galaxies